Division or divider may refer to:

Mathematics
Division (mathematics), the inverse of multiplication
Division algorithm, a method for computing the result of mathematical division

Military
Division (military), a formation typically consisting of 10,000 to 25,000 troops
Divizion, a subunit in some militaries
Division (naval), a collection of warships

Science
Cell division, the process in which biological cells multiply
Continental divide, the geographical term for separation between watersheds
Division (biology), used differently in botany and zoology
Division (botany), a taxonomic rank for plants or fungi, equivalent to phylum in zoology
Division (horticulture), a method of vegetative plant propagation, or the plants created by using this method
 Division, a medical/surgical operation involving cutting and separation, see ICD-10 Procedure Coding System

Technology
Beam compass, a compass with a beam and sliding sockets for drawing and dividing circles larger than those made by a regular pair of compasses
Divider caliper or compass, a caliper
Frequency divider, a circuit that divides the frequency of a clock signal

Society
Administrative division, territory into which a country is divided
Census division, an official term in Canada and the United States
Diairesis, Plato's method of definition by division
Division (business), of a business entity is a distinct part of that business but the primary business is legally responsible for all of the obligations and debts of the division
Division (political geography), a name for a subsidiary state or prefecture of a country
Division (sport), a group of teams in organised sport who compete for a divisional title
In parliamentary procedure:
Division of the assembly, a type of formally recorded vote by assembly members
Division of a question, to split a question into two or more questions
Partition (politics), the process of changing national borders or separating political entities
Police division, a large territorial unit of the British police

Places 
Division station (CTA North Side Main Line), a station on the Chicago Transit Authority's North Side Main Line
Division station (CTA Blue Line), a station on the Chicago Transit Authority's 'L' system, serving the Blue Line
Division Mountain, on the Continental Divide along the Alberta - British Columbia border of Canada
Division Range, Humboldt County, Nevada

Music
Division (10 Years album), 2008
Division (The Gazette album), 2012
Divisions (album), by Starset, 2019
Division (music), a type of ornamentation or variation found in early music
Divider, as in Schenkerian music analysis, a consonant subdivision of a consonant interval
"Division", a song by Aly & AJ from Insomniatic, 2007
"Divider", a song by Scott Weiland from the album 12 Bar Blues (album), 1998

Other uses
Divider, a central reservation in Bangladesh
Division of the field, a concept in heraldry
Division (logical fallacy), when one reasons logically that something true of a thing must also be true of all or some of its parts
Tom Clancy's The Division, a multiplayer video game by Ubisoft and Red Storm Entertainment
The Division (TV series), a police procedural

See also

Dvsn, Canadian musical group
Dividend, payments made by a corporation to its shareholder members
Compartment (disambiguation)
Div (disambiguation)
Divide (disambiguation)
Partition (disambiguation)
Section (disambiguation)
Segment (disambiguation)
Split (disambiguation)
Subdivision (disambiguation)